"Good Times" is a song by Canadian hard rock band Finger Eleven. It was released in April 2003 as the lead single from their eponymous album.

The song bears a more upbeat melody than many of Finger Eleven's previous singles. Vocals transition between heavy singing and falsetto during the chorus.

Music video
The song's music video features the band playing at the Ice Hotel in Quebec. While it did not receive significant airplay, "Good Times" managed to feature on MTV2.

In popular culture
The song is featured in the video games SSX 3 and 1080° Avalanche.

Track listing
 "Good Times"
 "Quicksand"
 "Complicated Questions"
 "Good Times" (Video)

Chart performance

References

2003 singles
2003 songs
Finger Eleven songs
Wind-up Records singles
Song recordings produced by Johnny K
Nu metal songs